Ash Green can refer to:
 Ash Green, Surrey
 Ash Green, Warwickshire

See also 
 Eight Ash Green, Essex
 New Ash Green, Kent